Sir Francis Sharp Powell, 1st Baronet (29 June 1827 – 24 December 1911) was an English Conservative politician who sat in the House of Commons between 1863 and 1910.

Powell was the son of the Rev. Benjamin Powell of Wigan and his wife Anne Wade, daughter of the Rev. T. Wade. He was educated at Uppingham School, Sedbergh School and St John's College, Cambridge He was called to the bar at Inner Temple in 1853, and practised on the Northern Circuit. He was a J.P. for Lancashire and the West Riding of Yorkshire.

In the 1857 general election Powell was elected as a Member of Parliament (MP) for Wigan, but was not re-elected in 1859. Later in that Parliament, he was elected at a by-election for Cambridge but lost the seat in the 1868 general election. He was re-elected in 1865, and held the seat until his defeat at the 1868 general election

He was next elected MP for Northern Division of West Riding, Yorkshire in 1872 but lost the seat in the 1874 general election. He was elected as MP for Wigan at a by-election in January 1881, but was unseated on account of corrupt practices at the election. He stood again for Wigan in the 1885 general election and was elected. He held the seat until the January 1910 general election.
He was a member of the Royal Commission on Sanitation and was created a baronet of Horton Old Hall in 1892. Powell was a benefactor to Wigan and Sedbergh Schools and was chairman of the governors of Sedbergh for over 35 years.

Powell was elected a member of the council of Selwyn College, Cambridge, in June 1902, and received the freedom of the city of Bradford on 24 October 1902, ″for eminent service rendered to the city during his career″. He was President of the Royal Statistical Society from 1904 to 1905.

Powell died at Horton Old Hall, Yorkshire at the age of 84 and a statue of him stands in Mesnes Park in the centre of the town of Wigan.

Powell married Anne Gregson of Toxteth Park, Liverpool in 1858. He had no heir to inherit the baronetcy which became extinct on his death.

Statue 

Ernest Gillick's statue of Sir Francis Powell stands in Mesnes Park, Wigan. Erected in his home town in 1910, the statue is made from bronze, which after turning green in colour due to lack of treatment, was restored in 2012. The statue shows Powell sat in his office chair, deep in thought. It also shows his right leg crossing in front of his left, which makes his right shoe protrude out further than the statue's base. It has long been a long-standing superstition that the rubbing of Powell's protruding shoe will bring a person good luck. Local belief in this tale is so strong that the shoe of the statue was never allowed to turn green due to the constant rubbing by locals and tourists.

References

External links 
 

1827 births
1911 deaths
People educated at Sedbergh School
Alumni of St John's College, Cambridge
UK MPs 1857–1859
UK MPs 1859–1865
UK MPs 1865–1868
UK MPs 1868–1874
UK MPs 1885–1886
UK MPs 1886–1892
UK MPs 1892–1895
UK MPs 1895–1900
UK MPs 1900–1906
UK MPs 1906–1910
Baronets in the Baronetage of the United Kingdom
Conservative Party (UK) MPs for English constituencies
Presidents of the Royal Statistical Society
Members of the Parliament of the United Kingdom for Wigan
Members of the Inner Temple